Cardiff Reform Synagogue (formerly Cardiff New Synagogue) is a synagogue in Cardiff, Wales. It is a member of the Movement for Reform Judaism.

Congregation
Cardiff New Synagogue was founded in 1948 to provide Jewish religious services in a less traditional style than those previously available in Cardiff. This attracted newly arrived immigrants from Germany, Czechoslovakia, Austria and elsewhere. The synagogue's name was later changed to Cardiff Reform Synagogue.

Services were initially held in Cardiff's Temple of Peace and Health, a non-religious civic building in Cathays Park.

In 2010, the synagogue was awarded over £33,000 by the Heritage Lottery Fund for a project showing how Reform Jews, some of whom had fled from central Europe, had adapted to life in Wales.

Building
In 1952, the community purchased Salem Welsh Baptist Chapel in Moira Terrace, Adamsdown, Cardiff, which it converted for use of a synagogue. The chapel was built in 1861 and was modified in 1877 and 1919.

See also
 List of Jewish communities in the United Kingdom
 Movement for Reform Judaism
 Cardiff United Synagogue

References

External links
 Official website
 The Movement for Reform Judaism
 Cardiff Reform Synagogue on Jewish Communities and Records – UK (hosted by jewishgen.org)
 Jewish Small Communities Network: Cardiff Reform Synagogue

1948 establishments in Wales
Adamsdown
Austrian-Jewish diaspora
Culture in Cardiff
Czech-Jewish diaspora
Former churches in Cardiff
German-Jewish culture in the United Kingdom
Reform synagogues in the United Kingdom
Religious buildings and structures in Cardiff
Synagogues in Wales